Nisi ni ti anđeo (trans. You're not an Angel as Well) is the second studio album by Serbian and former Yugoslav hard rock band Griva, released in 1985.

As Jugoton, the record label which released Griva's previous album did not want to release the album, the band released the album through the independent label Panonija koncert.

The song "I Law Myroslaw" (the title referring folk music singer Miroslav Ilić) and ridiculing "novokompovana muzika" fans is a cover of Joan Jett & the Blackhearts version of the song "I Love Rock 'n' Roll".

Track listing
"I Law Myroslaw" - 3:01
"Imaš 14 tek" - 2:42
"Ti i ja, anđeo i vrag" - 3:34
"Nije mi ništa" - 3:34
"Nisi ni ti anđeo" - 2:55
"Sve je to Rock 'n' Roll" - 3:20
"Ti si otisla u vojsku (klasa 1984)" - 4:13
"Ne treba mi doktor" - 3:22
"Lake žene i loše vino" - 2:54
"Nemoj mi se smejati u lice" - 3:55
"Ti si prava napast" - 3:19
"To je kraj" - 3:23

Personnel
Zlatko Karavla - vocals
Josip Sabo - guitar
Đorđe Jovanović - bass guitar
Laslo Novak - keyboards
Janoš Kazimić - drums

References 
 EX YU ROCK enciklopedija 1960-2006,  Janjatović Petar;  

Griva albums
1985 albums